Léon Eyrolles (14 December 1861 in Tulle – 3 December 1945 in Cachan?) was a French politician and entrepreneur. In 1891, he created the first École Spéciale des Travaux Publics and later a correspondence school.

Eyrolles developed his educative skills as he helped fellow site managers to pass civil servant selective exams. In 1902 he bought a large piece of land to extend the school and in 1924 he became the mayor of the newly founded city of Cachan which was split from the city of Arcueil.

Further reading

External links 
 École Spéciale des Travaux Publics du Bâtiment et de l'Industrie 

1861 births
1945 deaths
Mayors of places in Île-de-France
French businesspeople
People from Tulle